Thanura Gunasekera (born 6 April 1996) is a Sri Lankan cricketer. He made his first-class debut for Lankan Cricket Club in Tier B of the 2017–18 Premier League Tournament on 25 January 2018. He made his Twenty20 debut for Lankan Cricket Club in the 2017–18 SLC Twenty20 Tournament on 2 March 2018.

References

External links
 

1996 births
Living people
Sri Lankan cricketers
Lankan Cricket Club cricketers
People from Colombo